Land o' Lakes Flapjack Festival was an annual tradition in the community of Land o' Lakes, Florida, first held in 1976. It included parade floats, a pageant, honorary mayor, and pancake eating (including pancake eating contests). It has been superseded by Swampfest, held in the first weekend of November.

References

Festivals in Florida
Food and drink festivals in the United States
Tourist attractions in Pasco County, Florida
Land o' Lakes, Florida